Isha Koppikar is an Indian actress, model and politician who has appeared in Hindi films, along with Tamil films. She has also featured in several Telugu, Kannada and Marathi films.

Background
Koppikar was born in Mahim, Bombay (now Mumbai) in a Konkani family. She has one younger brother. She graduated in Life Sciences at Ramnarain Ruia College in Mumbai. While at college she appeared in a photoshoot for Indian photographer Gautam Rajadhyaksha. The shoot led to work in advertising as a model, notably for L'Oréal, Rexona, Camay, Tips & Toes and Coca-Cola. Koppikar competed in the 1995 Miss India contest, winning the Miss Talent Crown. Her modelling work gave her an introduction to the film industry and to her first film appearance in the Telugu movie W/o V. Vara Prasad in 1997.

Film career

Early years in South Indian cinema (1997–2001)
The 1998 Hindi film Ek Tha Dil Ek Thi Dhadkan, directed by Shahrukh Sultan, is often stated to be Koppikar's first film, but there is no evidence the project was ever released. Her career must therefore be said to have begun with the 1997 Telugu film W/o V. Vara Prasad, in which she appeared in a song with actor Vineeth. Her first movie in Tamil was Kadhal Kavidhai costarring Prashanth for which she won the Filmfare Best Female Debut Award. Her next Tamil movie was En Swasa Kaatre (1998]) opposite Arvind Swamy, directed by K. S. Ravi, with music by A. R. Rahman followed by a cameo appearance in Praveen Gandhi's Jodi starring Prashanth and Simran. In 1999, Koppikar starred in the gangland movie Nenjinile starring Vijay and directed by S. A. Chandrasekhar.

By 2000, Koppikar's sights were on Bollywood, but this did not stop her from appearing in three Kannada films with the ruling Sandalwood stars of the time: Hoo Anthiya Uhoo Anthiya with Ramesh,  O Nanna Nalle with Ravichandran and Surya Vamsha opposite Vishnuvardhan, all box office successes.

After a brief appearance in Bollywood's Fiza and Rahul, while she came back to the south in 2001 for Sundar C's Tamil project Kaathal Solla Vanthen the movie never took off. Koppikar's last two films down South were Telugu comedy Prematho Raa starring Venkatesh and Simran, and directed by Uday Shankar, and Narasimha starring Vijayakanth.

In 2000, Koppikar started her Bollywood career with a small role alongside Karisma Kapoor and Hrithik Roshan in Khalid Mohamed's Fiza and an item number appearance in Prakash Jha's Rahul. In 2001 she made her full-fledged Bollywood debut with Rajiv Rai's Pyaar Ishq Aur Mohabbat, starring Arjun Rampal and Sunil Shetty where she was paired with Shetty. Her next release was K. Raghavendra Rao's urban comedy Aamdani Atthani Kharcha Rupaiyaa opposite Govinda.

Later years in Bollywood (2002–2011)
In 2002, Koppikar appeared in an item number in Ram Gopal Verma's underworld movie Company starring Ajay Devgan, Vivek Oberoi and Manisha Koirala. The chartbusting item number choreographed by Ganesh Hegde earned her title of Khallas Girl. Another notable item number Ishq Samundar, in Sanjay Gupta's Reservoir Dogs remake Kaante starring Amitabh Bachchan, Sanjay Dutt and Sunil Shetty, raised her profile higher. She also won the Stardust Award for the Most Exciting New Face for her Khallas number.

Koppikar acted in five films in 2003. In Dil Ka Rishta, she starred opposite Arjun Rampal and Aishwarya Rai. Prawaal Raman's portmanteau film Darna Mana Hai saw her opposite Aftab Shivdasani. Chandraprakash Dwivedi cast her alongside Urmila Matondkar and Manoj Bajpai in the critically acclaimed Pinjar which went on to win the National Film Award for Best Feature Film on National Integration. A brief role in J. P. Dutta's war movie LOC Kargil paired her opposite Sunil Shetty again. And in Harry Baweja's Qayamat: City Under Threat, she played one of three terrorists fighting off co-stars Ajay Devgan and Sunil Shetty; a role which earned her a Filmfare nomination in the Best Villain category.

She had six releases in 2004. Both Mani Shankar's science fantasy Rudraksh and Kundan Shah's madcap comedy Ek Se Bhadkhar Ek teamed her with Sunil Shetty. In Krishna Cottage, she was cast opposite Sohail Khan for a creepy ghost story. Inteqam, directed by Pankaj Parashar and co-starring Manoj Bajpai, saw her revive the role played by Sharon Stone in the original Hollywood version: Basic Instinct. She made a cameo appearance in Kunal Kohli's  Hum Tum with Saif Ali Khan and Rani Mukerji. And played the leading role in Karan Razdan's – Girlfriend with Amrita Arora and Aashish Chaudhary. The controversial film depicting a lesbian relationship provoked a wide range of public protests.

In 2005, she had four releases. Sangeeth Sivan's bawdy comedy Kyaa Kool Hai Hum with Anupam Kher, Ritesh Deshmukh and Tusshar Kapoor saw her getting nominated in three separate award ceremonies (IIFA, Zee Cine Award and Star Screen Awards) for best actor in a comedy role. Two more comedies saw her make guest appearances: David Dhawan's Salman Khan vehicle Maine Pyaar Kyun Kiya?, and Abbas–Mustan's whodunit, 36 China Town with Akshaye Khanna and Kareena Kapoor. She also starred in Ram Gopal Varma's gangster flick D: Underworld Badhshah alongside Randeep Hooda and Chunky Pandey.

In 2006 Farhan Akhtar directed a remake of the Amitabh Bachchan hit Don: The Chase Begins Again with superstar Shahrukh Khan in the lead. Koppikar was cast as Khan's girlfriend 'Anita'. Dons tremendous success however did not benefit her checkered career. Vicky Ranawat's Haseena Smart Sexy and Dangerous managed a release towards the end of 2006, but Jagdish A Sharma's murder mystery Gahraee appeared directly on DVD while Hansal Mehta's Raakh and Jahnu Barua's Har Pal were shelved. Ram Gopal Varma's much discussed Shabri - struggled to attract a distributor.

Koppikar's high-profile film of 2007, Nikhil Advani's  Salaam-e-Ishq, had her sharing limited screen time with Sohail Khan. Later in the year came the haunted love triangle, Ram Gopal Varma's Darling, with Fardeen Khan and Esha Deol. Koppikar's first film release of 2008 was Atul Agnihotri's Hello, based on the best-selling novel One Night @ the Call Center by Chetan Bhagat. This was followed by Ek Vivaah... Aisa Bhi, a Rajshri Production directed by Kaushik Ghatak and co-starring Sonu Sood.

Koppikar married Timmy Narang in 2009. She had two releases in 2010: Right Yaaa Wrong by Neeraj Pathak and Manoj Tiwari's Hello Darling. Both films fared poorly at the box office.

Shabri, where she played a woman gangster of Mumbai, was eventually released in 2011. Her performance was praised but the film only had a limited release and failed to make an impact at the box office.

Secondary roles (2013–present)

In 2013, she made her Marathi debut in Maat, directed by Manohar Sarvankar. She played the lead role opposite Sameer Dharmadhikari in a story revolving around an ambitious couple. In 2017, she makes her comeback in Telugu with Keshava followed by the Marathi film, FU: Friendship Unlimited. The following year, she is seen in the Kannada films, Looty and Kavacha. She made her digital debut with the ALTBalaji web series titled Fixerr (2019) where she plays the role of sub-inspector Jayanti Javdekar, who lives in a modest house with her young son and husband. Later, she also seen in the crime thriller series Dahanam (2022).

Political career 
She joined the Bharatiya Janata Party in the presence of Union minister Nitin Gadkari. She has been appointed as the working president of the BJP's women transport wing.

Other works
Between filming Koppikar, like many Bollywood actors, performs in stage music shows. In addition to this she has appeared in two music videos: Patli Kamar by KK for a private album commissioned by Sony in 2001/2002; and Bandish Projekt's Bhor (Satyam Shivam Sundaram) in 2004, choreographed by Bosco-Caesar. In 2006 she appeared onstage in the Indian Idol Grand Final to dance with the two finalists, and 2007 saw her as one of three judges in the celebrity dance competition Nach Baliye 3, alongside director David Dhawan and Vaibhavi Merchant. She had also owned a restaurant back in 2015. She served as a judge in the Miss Universe 2008 contest, held on 14 July in Vietnam alongside, amongst others, fashion designer Roberto Cavalli and former winner in 2004 Jennifer Hawkins. In August 2009, she presented the new Colors wrestling show 100% De Dana Dan.

She continues to model for fashion designers Anita Dongre and Pria Kataria Puri. In 2007, she became the Indian brand ambassador of the Italian fashion company Police Time and Jewellery. Koppikar is also a spokesperson for the animal rights organisation PETA and received the 10th Anniversary Humanitarian Award in December 2009.

Personal life

She has a black-belt in Taekwondo.

Following the advice of numerologists, she has changed the spelling of her name twice, first to Ishaa Koppikar and later to Eesha Koppikhar. However, as of 2015 she has reverted to the original spelling of her name.

Leena Mogre and Preity Zinta introduced her to hotelier Timmy Narang, whom she married on 29 November 2009. She gave birth to their daughter Rianna in July 2014.

Filmography

Web series

Awards and nominations

Music videos

Music and music videos

References

External links

 
 
 

Living people
Year of birth missing (living people)
Actresses from Mumbai
Female models from Mumbai
Indian film actresses
Indian web series actresses
Konkani people
Actresses in Hindi cinema
Actresses in Tamil cinema
Actresses in Telugu cinema
Actresses in Kannada cinema
Actresses in Marathi cinema
Indian female taekwondo practitioners
Filmfare Awards South winners
20th-century Indian actresses
21st-century Indian actresses